Braunia may refer to:
 Braunia, a genus of mosses in the family Hedwigiaceae
 Braunia, a genus of flatworms in the family Diphyllobothriidae, synonym of Ligula
 Braunia, a genus of fungi in the family Strophariaceae, synonym of Brauniella